Afrasura hyporhoda is a moth of the subfamily Arctiinae first described by George Hampson in 1900. It is found in Kenya and Sierra Leone.

References

Moths described in 1900
hyporhoda
Moths of Africa